Samanthakuru is a village in Allavaram Mandal, Dr. B.R. Ambedkar Konaseema district in the state of Andhra Pradesh in India.

Geography 

Demographics 
 India census, Samanthakuru had a population of 3386, out of which 1679 were male and 1707 were female. The population of children below 6 years of age was 10%. The literacy rate of the village was 65%.

References 

Villages in Allavaram mandal